Whatever I Say Is Royal Ocean is the debut EP by American post-hardcore band Dance Gavin Dance. Released on November 14, 2006, the album was originally recorded over a six month period with producer Phil Devereux and was subsequently produced and mastered by Kris Crummett after the band signed to Rise Records.

Track listing

Personnel 
Dance Gavin Dance
 Jonny Craig – clean vocals
 Jon Mess – unclean vocals
 Will Swan – guitar
 Sean O'Sullivan – guitar
 Eric Lodge – bass guitar
 Matt Mingus – drums, percussion

Additional personnel
 Dance Gavin Dance – production
 Phil Devereux – production, engineering and mixing
 Kris Crummett – mastering
 Jon Mess – album artwork
 Kaela Christianson – CD artwork drawn

References

2006 albums
Rise Records EPs
Dance Gavin Dance albums